Andor Kertész may refer to:

 André Kertész (1894–1985), born Andor Kertész, Hungarian-born American photographer
 Andor Kertész (1929–1974), Hungarian mathematician